= Abdullah Kili =

- Location within Pakistan
- Coordinates: 33.83°N 70.07°E
- Country: Pakistan
- Territory: Federally Administered Tribal Areas
- Elevation: 1,449 m (4,754 ft)
- Time zone: UTC+5 (PST)
  - Summer (DST): UTC+6 (PDT)

Abdullah Kili is a town in the Federally Administered Tribal Areas of Pakistan. It is located at 33°49'45N 70°4'1E with an altitude of 1449 metres (4757 feet).
